Maya (Chandi Gupta) is an Indian superheroine in the DC Universe. She first appeared in Justice League Europe #47 (1993), and was created by Gerard Jones and Ron Randall.

Fictional character biography
Chandi Gupta manifested her elemental powers at an early age, barely into her teenage years. Her parents, unsure of what to do, left her in the care of a strange Indian cult that they themselves had become followers of. The leaders of this cult were convinced that she was the reincarnation of one of the Hindu gods, Shiva. Chandi, confused and terrified, realised that the cult was evil and planning to sacrifice her. Horrified, she escaped, and fled to London.

With the League
In London under the alias Maya, she witnesses the Justice League Europe brawl with the supervillain Sonar. She reluctantly uses her powers to assist them in their battle and manages to single-handedly defeat the threat. Grateful for her timely assistance, the JLE offers her official membership. Feeling she had nowhere else to go, she gladly accepts. One of her earliest missions with them involves a return to her homeland India, where she comes under attack from her supposed protector, the Mahayogi. Fortunately, she fends him off long enough to escape and rejoin her team.

Maya is alone in the Justice League castle headquarters when it is attacked by three of the Bloodlines parasites. She manages to evade them and summons help by firing bursts of energy high into the night sky. She is rescued by her teammates and the armored superhero Lionheart.

Overmaster
The JLE journey to Nepal, where she encounters a boy with powers similar to hers. However, the child is killed, and Maya learns that the cult that had held her as a young girl was a front for a villain called the Overmaster, who planned to destroy the Earth. Overmaster takes control of her mind and uses her against her teammates, but the Mahayogi, whom she had fought earlier with the League, sacrifices himself in order to free her mind. After a climactic confrontation with the Overmaster, the JLE disbands. Maya's parents (her mother Bharata; her father is unnamed) demonstrate fire-based powers of their own that involve an amulet and calling upon Shiva. Realizing they were no longer part of the cult, Maya decides to give her parents one more chance. Their reunion is marred by a confrontation with the armored, League-hating Vox Humana. Though the League assists Maya and her parents, the villains are driven away by human League supporters.

Maya resides with her parents in India. She attended the "funeral" of Maxwell Lord. She was also seen in an adventure in which she aids Wonder Woman.

Infinite Crisis and Beyond

She was briefly seen during Infinite Crisis. Maya made her most recent appearance in the Teen Titans series during the Final Crisis and Battle for the Cowl events. She is one of the candidates considered by Robin to replace the empty slots on the team roster left by Supergirl, Miss Martian, and Rose Wilson. Maya ultimately ends up being passed over in favor of Static, Aquagirl, and Kid Eternity.

Powers and abilities
Maya was originally only able to manifest a mystical bow. She has used it as a conventional bow, able to fire sometimes devastatingly powerful projectiles usually made of mystical fire or water, or, on one occasion, to enhance her speed and strength. She later developed the ability to manifest large amounts of fire or water without using the bow as a focus. Her powers are similar to those of the Indian heroine Celsius.

External links
DCU Guide: Maya

References

Comics characters introduced in 1993
DC Comics female superheroes
Fictional archers
DC Comics characters who use magic
Fictional characters with fire or heat abilities
Fictional necromancers
Indian superheroes